Roger M. Marino is a retired American engineer, businessman, and co-founder of EMC Corporation. His substantial contribution to Northeastern University funded their athletic center, which has been named in Marino's honor.

Corporate career

Roger M. Marino graduated from Northeastern University in 1961. In 1979 Marino founded the high technology design and manufacturing company EMC Corporation with his former Northeastern roommate, Richard Egan. He served as the company's president until he retired from the position in 1992. EMC Corporation entered the Fortune 500 Companies list in 1994. Since his retirement, Marino has been active in funding a number of start-up companies. In 2001 Mr. Marino founded the film production company Revere Pictures.  Marino currently serves as a director of TechTarget, Incorporated.

Sports investments

In 1997 Roger Marino purchased a 100% stake in the Pittsburgh Penguins NHL team for the price of $40 million. Roger transferred ownership 4 years later. Marino has expressed a strong interest in an ownership stake in the Boston Red Sox, but has yet to make the investment.

Net worth

In its 2000 list of the Forbes 400, Marino was ranked as the 236th richest American, with a net worth of approximately $1.2 billion.

References

External links
Notable Northeastern University Electrical and Computer Engineering Alumni
EMC Corporation Website

Northeastern University alumni
American billionaires
American manufacturing businesspeople
American people of Italian descent
Dell EMC
National Hockey League executives
National Hockey League owners
Pittsburgh Penguins owners
Living people
Year of birth missing (living people)